DD, dd, or other variants may refer to:

Arts and entertainment 
"D.D.", a track on mixtape Echoes of Silence by The Weeknd
DD (character), a character in The Saga of Seven Suns novels by Kevin J. Anderson
DD National or DD1, an Indian national television channel
Dancing Dolls, a Japanese all-female pop group
Daredevil (Marvel Comics character), a Marvel Comics character
Matt Murdock (Marvel Cinematic Universe), the Marvel Cinematic Universe counterpart
 Decorative Designers
Donegal Daily, an Irish news website
Doordarshan, a public service broadcaster in India
Erann DD, a Danish singer and songwriter
DD, the production code for the 1966 Doctor Who serial The Tenth Planet

Business 
 DuPont, which trades shares on the New York Stock Exchange as DD
 Dunkin' Donuts, a company

Military 
 DD tank, an amphibious tank
 Dishonorable discharge, a punitive discharge in the U.S. military
 DD, the U.S. Navy hull classification for destroyers
 DD Form 214, a form used by the U.S. Defense Department

Places
 DD postcode area, in Scotland
 .dd, a hypothetical domain name for the German Democratic Republic
 Dresden, Germany (license plate code DD)

Science and technology

Computing 
 , an HTML element for specifying definition data
 dd (Unix), a program that copies and converts files and data
 Deckadance, a DJ program for Windows and Mac OS X designed by Image-Line
 Deployment descriptor, a component in Java Platform, Enterprise Edition applications
 Logo for Dolby Digital, audio compression technologies developed by Dolby Laboratories
 Double density, a capacity designation on magnetic storage, usually floppy disks
 Debian Developer, the traditional full-membership role in Debian

Other uses in science and technology
 Data Deficient, a rating on the IUCN Red List of Threatened Species
 Decimal degrees, geographic coordinates shown using decimal fractions
 Death domain, a protein-interaction module, a subclass of the death fold protein motif
 DD Index, for Democracy-Dictatorship Index
 Abbreviation for dolichospondylic dysplasia, a genetic syndrome
 Developmental disability, or developmentally disabled, a diverse group of chronic conditions due to mental or physical impairments arising before adulthood
 Deuterium-deuterium fusion, a type of nuclear fusion

Sports 
 Delhi Daredevils, former name of Delhi Capitals
 Delhi Dynamos FC, an Indian Super League franchise, now Odisha FC

Transportation 
 DD tank, an amphibious tank
 D-D locomotive, the AAR classification for a railway locomotive with two four-axle bogies
 Danish Air Lines, an airline
 Invincible D-D, a prototype aircraft
 Nok Air, a low-cost airline based in Thailand
 Victorian Railways Dd class, a class of steam locomotives in Australia

Other uses 
 DD, a brassiere measurement
 Dd (digraph), in the Welsh language
 Degree of difficulty, in several sports
 Demand draft, a negotiable instrument issued by the bank
 Deputy Director (disambiguation), a rank in some organizations
 Designated driver, a person who remains sober as the responsible driver
 Doctor of Divinity, an academic degree
 Dine and dash, a form of theft by fraud
 Direct debit, a way of paying bills

See also
 Dede (disambiguation)
 Dedee, a nickname
 Deede (disambiguation)
 Deedee (disambiguation)
 Didi (disambiguation)